The former Pembroke High School, also known as the Indian Education Resource Center, is a historic high school building located at Pembroke, Robeson County, North Carolina.  It was designed and built by the Public Works Administration in 1939. It is a one-story, brick building consisting of a central entrance pavilion and auditorium, with flanking classroom wings. The building was renovated in late 1992. The building originally housed a high school for Native American students of the Lumbee tribe.

It was added to the National Register of Historic Places in 1995.

References

Public Works Administration in North Carolina
Native American history of North Carolina
School buildings on the National Register of Historic Places in North Carolina
School buildings completed in 1939
Buildings and structures in Robeson County, North Carolina
National Register of Historic Places in Robeson County, North Carolina
1939 establishments in North Carolina